Cibitoke is a city located in northwestern Burundi, near the border of Democratic Republic of the Congo. It is the capital of the Cibitoke Province.

The city is the birthplace of Olympic judoka Odette Ntahonvukiye.

Cibotoke Province is governed by a community administrator. It is further divided into 6 communes:

 Buganda
 Bukinanyana
 Murwi
 Rugombo
 Mugina
 Mabayi

Populated places in Burundi